McClelland Lake is located near Williams in North Central Arizona, United States.

Fish species

 Largemouth Bass
 Crappie
 Sunfish
 Catfish (Channel)
 Northern Pike
 Yellow Perch

References

External links
Arizona Boating Locations Facilities Map
Arizona Fishing Locations Map

Lakes of Arizona
Lakes of Coconino County, Arizona